The 1940 Montana Grizzlies football team represented the University of Montana in the 1940 college football season as a member of the Pacific Coast Conference (PCC). The Grizzlies were led by sixth-year head coach Doug Fessenden, played their home games at Dornblaser Field and finished the season with a record of four wins, four losses and one tie (4–4–1, 1–2 PCC).

Schedule

References

External links
Game program: Montana at Washington State – October 5, 1940

Montana
Montana Grizzlies football seasons
Montana Grizzlies football